Sveinsdóttir is a large impact crater on Mercury.

Sveinsdóttir crater superimposed by Beagle Rupes is a distinctive feature on Mercury's landscape. Unusually elliptical in shape, the crater was produced by the impact of an object that hit Mercury's surface obliquely. The floor of Sveinsdóttir was later covered by the smooth plains material and deformed by wrinkle-ridges before the scarp appeared.

Beagle Rupes crosscuts Sveinsdóttir crater and has uplifted the easternmost portion (right side portion) of the crater floor by almost a kilometer, indicating that most of the fault activity at Beagle Rupes occurred after the impact that created Sveinsdóttir. Crosscutting relationships such as this are used to understand the sequence in time of the different processes that have affected Mercury's evolution.

The crater is named after Júlíana Sveinsdóttir, an Icelandic painter and textile artist.

References

Impact craters on Mercury